Lalbaug or (ISO: Lālbāg) is a neighbourhood in South Bombay in Bombay, the capital of Maharashtra an Indian state. It was once part of the neighbourhood called Girangaon - Mumbai's mill district that is now undergoing gentrification due to the shifting of textiles mills to Gujarat.It is Well Connected Via railways which include Curry Road station of Central Railway, Lower Parel station Of Western Railway & New Lower Parel Monorail station.

See also
 Lalbaugcha Raja (prominent idol during the Ganesh Chaturthi festival)

References 

Neighbourhoods in Mumbai